American Appraisal is a company that employs roughly 300 people in 60 locations around the world. Publicly notable projects conducted by American Appraisal include, for example, a "fresh start" valuation of MCI's assets after its chapter 11 bankruptcy filing or the retrospective valuation of the World Trade Center for Larry Silverstein's court case.

References

Management consulting firms of the United States